On 20 July 2017, Sir Vince Cable became Leader of the Liberal Democrats after facing no competition. He was the oldest leader of a major UK political party since Sir Winston Churchill. Upon taking office Cable made no significant reshuffle to his Frontbench Team, so the line-up remained much as it was inherited from Tim Farron. Cable later completed his first reshuffle a few weeks after the Party's 2017 Autumn Conference.

Cable previously served as Acting Leader of the Liberal Democrats following the resignation of Menzies Campbell in 2007.

Liberal Democrat Frontbench Team (2017- 2019)
Second Frontbench Team of Vince Cable

Changes 

 10 June 2018: Christine Jardine is appointed as temporary cover for the Foreign Affairs spokesperson post while Jo Swinson is on maternity leave.

References

See also
Cabinet of the United Kingdom
Official Opposition Shadow Cabinet (UK)
Frontbench Team of Ian Blackford
Liberal Democrat frontbench team
 Lib Dems

Politics of the United Kingdom
2010s in the United Kingdom
2017 establishments in the United Kingdom
British shadow cabinets
2017 in British politics
Liberal Democrats (UK) frontbench team